Geoffrey Charles Marks (2 January 1932 – 30 August 1990) was a Sri Lankan swimmer. He competed in three events at the 1952 Summer Olympics.

References

External links
 

1932 births
1990 deaths
Sri Lankan male swimmers
Olympic swimmers of Sri Lanka
Swimmers at the 1952 Summer Olympics
Swimmers from Colombo
Sri Lankan emigrants to Australia